The Chrysler ecoVoyager is a concept car that was revealed on January 14, 2008 by Chrysler. It was introduced at the 2008 North American International Auto Show.

References

EcoVoyage
Minivans

Fuel cell vehicles
Hydrogen cars
Electric concept cars